Nazmizan Mohamad (born 4 April 1981) is a Malaysian sprinter. He competed in the men's 200 metres at the 2004 Summer Olympics.

References

External links

1981 births
Living people
Athletes (track and field) at the 2004 Summer Olympics
Malaysian male sprinters
Olympic athletes of Malaysia
Southeast Asian Games medalists in athletics
Place of birth missing (living people)
Southeast Asian Games gold medalists for Malaysia
Athletes (track and field) at the 2002 Asian Games
Competitors at the 2003 Southeast Asian Games
Asian Games competitors for Malaysia
University of Putra Malaysia alumni